Domestic club rugby union within Scotland remains a predominantly amateur sport; however, semi-professional and professional outfits have been created in recent decades to participate in cross-border competitions.

Professional Outfits

With the advent of professionalism in 1995 the Scottish Rugby Union, just like the Irish Rugby Football Union, decided that existing club sides would be unable to compete with their counterparts in new cross-border tournaments such as the European Cup and Celtic League. It was decided by the Scottish Rugby Union that new professional teams would be created based on the union's four historic geographical districts and building upon the legacy/vehicle of the Scottish Inter-District Championship:

The North and Midlands side was a de facto district based on the combination of The North and Midlands districts.

Domestic Rugby

Scottish League Championship
The Scottish League Championship is the annual domestic league structure competed for by over 150 clubs at both national and regional levels. 

Prior to restructuring in 2010, there were six national leagues - three divisions in the Premiership, and three in the National League - above the Regional Leagues. Further restructuring before the 2014-15 season scrapped the regional Championship A & B leagues which sat below the National League for two seasons. The current structure is:

The Premiership: 10 clubs, top four compete in a knock-out play-off to decide the Premiership champions, bottom team relegated and ninth-placed enter promotion/relegation play-off
National League: 36 clubs in three divisions:
Division 1: 12 clubs, winners promoted, runners-up enter promotion/relegation play-off, bottom two teams relegated
Division 2: 12 clubs, winners and runners-up promoted, bottom two teams relegated
Division 3: 12 clubs, winners and runners-up promoted, bottom three teams relegated to the appropriate Regional league
Regional Leagues: 3 Regions (Caledonia, East and West) who organize their own league structures (though top divisions normally consist of 10 clubs), with the winners of each region promoted

Structure

Scottish Cup
The Scottish Cup was introduced in 1995 as a complementary knock-out cup competition. Though the structure of the cup has been changed numerous times it is currently contested by all National League clubs in the first round, with Premiership teams being added in the second and third rounds. The main cup competition is supplemented by regional shield and bowl competitions which all culminate in a 'Finals Day' at Murrayfield Stadium.

Scottish SuperCup
During the 2006-07 season an extra cup competition (The Scottish SuperCup) was introduced to replace the loss of fixtures in the Premiership due to league restricting. With the reversal of this restriction the following season the cup became redundant and was abandoned after a single season.

British and Irish Cup
For the 2009-10 season a new cross-border tournament was introduced, the British and Irish Cup which would contain semi-professional clubs from the four home nations. Originally Scotland was represented by three sides but with restricting this has increased to four, who are determined by final positions in the League Championship.

Unincorporated Leagues

Scotland is also home to the oldest organised rugby union league in the world, the Border League, which was formed in 1901. The Border League does not take part in the pyramid structure to the National League, but all of its clubs play in both. Two small independent leagues remain, with only a handful of members: the Grampian Alliance League and the Highland Alliance League. For university and 2nd and 3rd XV leagues, see University Leagues in Scotland and 2nd XV Leagues in Scotland.

There are a small number of women's leagues in operation - see University Leagues in Scotland and SWRU League.

See also
 Rugby union in Scotland
 League system

Sources
 http://www.scottishrugby.org/

Sports league systems